Nansha Ferry Port  is a ferry terminal on the shore of the Pearl river (aka Zhujiang River), in the Nansha District in the Southern China's Guangdong province, situated immediately north of Hong Kong. It includes a passenger terminal for high-speed ferries connecting the Nansha District, in mainland China, with Zhuhai and Hong Kong.

See also 
 Chu Kong Passenger Transport Co., Ltd

Shenzhen
Ports and harbours of China